Golden Animals is an American pop / rock & roll / psychedelic / blues / folk / country band formed by Tommy Eisner in 2006.

History
The group began in Brooklyn, New York, as a duo with Linda Beecroft, who added drums and backing vocals to songs Eisner had been writing, recording and performing solo since 2002.  In 2014, Eisner and Beecroft decided to take a break from playing together.  In the summer of 2016, Eisner moved to Los Angeles to reform the group as a larger ensemble adding Eyal Lidergot (Guitar), TJ Tate (Guitar), Matteo Arias (Bass), and Justin Smith (drums).

Recordings and tours
After a series of home recordings, Golden Animals recorded their first studio EP, Do The Roar! (2007), with Chris Coady at StayGold (part of Headgear Studio in Brooklyn, NY, which was later released by HappyParts Recordings. In 2008, the group released their first LP Free Your Mind And Win A Pony (2008), produced and engineered by Chris Coady at Tiny Telephone Studio, mixed by Thom Monahan and released by HappyParts Recordings.  The band's second LP Hear Eye Go (2013) was recorded and co-mixed with Matt Boynton at Vacation Island Recordings and released by The Reverberation Appreciation Society. The band toured nationally with The Black Angels and Roky Erickson in the winter of 2014.

References

Psychedelic pop music groups
Musical groups established in 2007